Cocculus  is a genus of 11 species of woody vines and shrubs, native to warm temperate to tropical regions of North America, Asia and Africa. The common name moonseed is also used for the closely related genus Menispermum.

Selected species
Cocculus carolinus (L.) DC. – red-berried moonseed or Carolina moonseed (southeastern United States)
Cocculus diversifolius DC. – correhuela (southern Texas, southern Arizona and northern Mexico)
Cocculus hirsutus (L.) Diels (tropical Africa east to India and Nepal)
Cocculus laurifolius DC. – laurel-leaved snail tree (Himalayas east to Japan)
Cocculus orbiculatus (L.) DC. – queen coralbead (India east to Java)
Cocculus sarmentosus (Lour.) Diels (Taiwan)

Formerly placed here
Jateorhiza palmata (Lam.) Miers (as C. palmatus (Lam.) DC.)
Pericampylus glaucus (Lam.) Merr. (as C. incanus Colebr.)
Sinomenium acutum (Thunb.) Rehder & E.H.Wilson (as C. diversifolius Miq.)
Tinospora cordifolia (Willd.) Hook.f. & Thomson (as C. cordifolius (Willd.) DC.)

References

External links

Cocculus carolinus images at bioimages.vanderbilt.edu

 
Menispermaceae genera